Sin Fronteras (Spanish, translating as 'without borders') may refer to:

Sin Fronteras (Dulce María album), 2014
Sin Fronteras (Makano album), 2010